Mary Maguire Alden (June 18, 1883 – July 2, 1946) was an American motion picture and stage actress. She was one of the first Broadway actresses to work in Hollywood.

Life
Alden was born in New York City on June 18, 1883. She performed on Broadway in Personal (1907) and The Rule of Three (1914). She worked for the Biograph Company and Pathé Exchange in the first portion of her career. Her most popular role in movies came in The Birth of a Nation directed by D.W. Griffith in 1915. Alden played the role of a mulatto woman in love with a northern politician. The following year she was in Griffith's Intolerance with Mae Marsh, Miriam Cooper, and Vera Lewis. After making Less Than The Dust with Mary Pickford in 1917, she took a temporary leave from motion pictures, acting for a while on the stage. Critics acclaimed Alden's portrayal of the mother, Mrs. Anthon, in The Old Nest (1921) and her characterization of an old lady in The Man With Two Mothers (1922). The latter feature was produced by Sam Goldwyn.

Alden was a prolific motion picture actress throughout the 1920s and into the early 1930s. A sampling of movies in which she had roles are The Plastic Age (1925), The Joy Girl (1927), Ladies of the Mob (1928), and Port of Dreams (1929). The final films she received screen credit for are Hell's House, Rasputin and the Empress, and Strange Interlude, each from 1932.

Alden died at the Motion Picture & Television Country House and Hospital in Woodland Hills, Los Angeles, California in 1946, aged 63 years. This had been her residence for the last four years of her life.
Alden was interred in an unmarked grave under her married name of Deangman in Valhalla Memorial Park Cemetery in North Hollywood, California.

Selected filmography

 The Battle of the Sexes (1914) as Mrs. Frank Andrews
 Home, Sweet Home (1914) as The Mother
 The Birth of a Nation (1915) as Lydia, Stoneman's Mulatto Housekeeper
 The Slave Girl (1915, Short) as Sally, a Yellow Girl
 The Outcast (1915) as The Girl's Mother
 A Man's Prerogative (1915) as Elizabeth Towne
 Ghosts (1915) as Helen Arling
 The Lily and the Rose (1915) as Mrs. Fairfax
 Acquitted (1916) as Mrs. Carter
 The Good Bad-Man (1916) as Jane Stuart
 Macbeth (1916) as Lady Macduff
 An Innocent Magdalene (1916) as The Woman
 Hell-to-Pay Austin (1916) as Doris Valentine
 Pillars of Society (1916) as Lona Tonnesen
 The Narrow Path (1916) as Shirley Martin
 Intolerance (1916) as Uplifter #1
 Less Than the Dust (1916) as Mrs. Bradshaw
 The Argyle Case (1917) as Nellie Marsh
 The Land of Promise (1917) as Gertie Marsh
 The Naulahka (1918) as Prince's Mother
 The Narrow Path (1918) as Margaret Dunn
 Common Clay (1919) as Mrs. Neal
 The Unpardonable Sin (1919) as Mrs. Parcot
 The Mother and the Law (1919) as An Uplifter
 The Broken Butterfly (1919) as Zabie Elliot
 Erstwhile Susan (1919) as Erstwhile Susan
 The Inferior Sex (1920) as Clarissa Mott-Smith
 Parted Curtains (1920) as Mrs. Masters
 Miss Nobody (1920) as Jason's Wife
 Milestones (1920) as Rose Sibley
 Honest Hutch (1920) as Mrs. Hutchins
 Silk Husbands and Calico Wives (1920) as Edith Beecher Kendall
 Trust Your Wife (1921)
 The Witching Hour (1921) as Helen Whipple
 Snowblind (1921) as Bella
 The Old Nest (1921) as Mrs. Anthon
 Man with Two Mothers (1922) as Widow O'Neill
 The Hidden Woman (1922) as Mrs. Randolph
 A Woman's Woman (1922) as Densie Plummer
 Notoriety (1922) as Ann Boland
 The Bond Boy (1922) as Mrs. Newboat
 Has the World Gone Mad! (1923) as Mrs. Bell
 The Tents of Allah (1923) as Oulaid
 The Empty Cradle (1923) as Alice Larkin
 The Steadfast Heart (1923) as Mrs. Burke
 The Eagle's Feather (1923) as Delia Jamiesoon
 Pleasure Mad (1923) as Marjorie Benton
 Painted People (1924) as Mrs. Bryne
 A Fool's Awakening (1924) as Myra
 When a Girl Loves (1924) as The Czarina
 Babbitt (1924) as Mrs. Myra Babbitt
 The Beloved Brute (1924) as Augustina
 Siege (1925) as Aunt Augusta Ruyland
 Faint Perfume (1925) as Ma Crumb
 The Happy Warrior (1925) as Aunt Maggie
 Under the Rouge (1925) as Martha Maynard
 The Unwritten Law (1925) as Miss Grant
 Soiled (1925) as Mrs. Brown
 The Plastic Age (1925) as Mrs. Carver
 The Earth Woman (1926) as Martha Tilden (The Earth Woman)
 Brown of Harvard (1926) as Mrs. Brown
 Lovey Mary (1926) as Mrs. Wiggs
 April Fool (1926) as Amelia Rosen
 The Potters (1927) as Ma Potter
 The Joy Girl (1927) as Mrs. Courage
 Twin Flappers (1927)
 Fools for Luck (1928) as Mrs. Hunter
 Ladies of the Mob (1928) as Soft Annie
 The Cossacks (1928) as Lukashka's Mother
 The Sawdust Paradise (1928) as Mother
 Someone to Love (1928) as Harriet Newton
 Girl Overboard (1929)
 Bad Sister (1931) as Minor Role (uncredited)
 Politics (1931) as Mrs. Mary Evans
 Hell's House (1932) as Lucy Mason (uncredited)
 When a Feller Needs a Friend (1932) as Mrs. Higgins (uncredited)
 Strange Interlude (1932) as Mary, the Leeds' maid
 Rasputin and the Empress (1932) as Natasha's Lady in Waiting (uncredited)
 One More Spring (1935) as Minor Role (uncredited)
 The Great Hotel Murder (1935) as Mrs. Harvey (uncredited)
 Gentle Julia (1936) as Aunt (uncredited)
 Legion of Terror (1936) as Accident Onlooker (uncredited)
 Career Woman (1936) as Townswoman (uncredited)
 That I May Live (1937) as Woman in Auto Camp (uncredited) (final film role)

References

Further reading

External links

 
 
 
 
 Literature on Mary Alden

American silent film actresses
American stage actresses
Burials at Valhalla Memorial Park Cemetery
1883 births
1946 deaths
Actresses from New York City
20th-century American actresses
American film actresses